Flight 2 may refer to the following aviation accidents or incidents:

Trans World Airlines Flight 2, one of the flights involved in the 1956 Grand Canyon mid-air collision on 30 June 1956
Helitech Flight 2, one of the flights involved in the 1986 Grand Canyon mid-air collision on 18 June, 1986

0002